Bernard Bruand (born 16 June 1951) is a French rower. He competed at the 1972 Summer Olympics, 1976 Summer Olympics and the 1980 Summer Olympics.

References

1951 births
Living people
French male rowers
Olympic rowers of France
Rowers at the 1972 Summer Olympics
Rowers at the 1976 Summer Olympics
Rowers at the 1980 Summer Olympics
Place of birth missing (living people)